Hudson Island is the southernmost island of the Family Islands group and located approximately 20 km East of Tully Heads. The Aboriginal name for this island is Coolah Island.

The Great Barrier Reef Marine Park Authority has deemed this island a Sensitive Location and limits visits to two per week.

Islands on the Great Barrier Reef
Uninhabited islands of Australia
Islands of Far North Queensland
Protected areas of Far North Queensland